Kholodnoye is a rural locality (a selo) in Prokhorovsky District, Belgorod Oblast, Russia. The population was 895 as of 2010. There are 13 streets.

Geography 
Kholodnoye is located 28 km east of Prokhorovka (the district's administrative centre) by road. Studyony is the nearest rural locality.

References 

Rural localities in Prokhorovsky District